Michele Bentoglio (born 30 November 1993) is an Italian footballer.

Career
In January 2012, Bentoglio moved from Sarnico to Parma on loan until the end of the season. This move was made permanent at the end of the season in July. For the following season, he was loaned to FeralpiSalò and then to Saint-Christophe Aosta Valley.

On 16 July 2014 Bentoglio left for Gubbio along with Daniele Casiraghi, Tommaso Domini, Alessandro Luparini and Pietro Manganelli in temporary deals.

References

External links
 AIC profile (data by football.it) 

Italian footballers
Parma Calcio 1913 players
1993 births
Living people
Association football forwards
Sportspeople from the Province of Bergamo
People from Calcinate
Footballers from Lombardy